Schank may refer to:

 John Schank (c. 1740–1823), officer of the British Royal Navy
 Roger Schank (born 1946), American artificial intelligence theorist and cognitive psychologist
 Marco Schank (born 1954), Luxembourgian politician 
 Mike Schank (1969–2022), American actor and musician

See also
 Schack
 Schanck (disambiguation)
 Schenk
 Shank (disambiguation)
 Shenk